Married to the Eiffel Tower is The Wolfmen's second studio album. It was released digitally on 2 May 2011 and in August 2011 on Compact Disc and vinyl. The title is likely a reference to Erika Eiffel, a woman who famously "married" the Eiffel Tower in 2008.

Track listing
 "Cat Green Eyes"
 "Mr Sunday"
 "Jackie, Is It My Birthday?"
 "I’m Not A Young Man Anymore"
 "Marilyn Monroe (Wam Bam JFK)"
 "July 20"
 "Damn It Can’t You Just Be Straight"
 "The Cowboy's Dream"
 "Coca-Cola Kid"
 "Blushing God"

References

2011 albums
The Wolfmen albums